Kilduff is a surname. Notable people with the surname include:

Christine Kilduff, American politician
Ciarán Kilduff (born 1988), Irish footballer
Malcolm Kilduff (1927–2003), American journalist
Marshall Kilduff (born 1949), American journalist
Martin Kilduff, British academic
Mitchell Kilduff (born 1996), Australian swimmer
Pete Kilduff (1893–1930), American baseball player
Thomas Kilduff, American neuroscientist
Vinnie Kilduff (born 1960), Irish folk artist